Artern is a town in the Kyffhäuserkreis district, Thuringia, Germany. The former municipalities Heygendorf and Voigtstedt were merged into Artern in January 2019.

Geography
Artern is situated at the confluence of the rivers Unstrut and Helme, on a bend of the Unstrut, which flows through the town from the southeast to the northwest.

It is located in the north east of Thuringia, close to the border with Saxony Anhalt, and 12 km south of Sangerhausen.

Transport
Artern is on the Sangerhausen–Erfurt railway and so has railway connections to Erfurt and Sangerhausen. The railway connection to Naumburg was cancelled in December 2006. The population was 6,165 in the 2006 census.

History
The first known documented mention of Artern was as  Aratora in the early 9th Century, in a register of estates at Hersfeld Abbey. The water castle of Artern was built from the 10th Century.

Machinery, sugar and boots used to be manufactured in Artern.

Its brine springs, known as early as the 15th century, are still frequented.

In 1944 a subcamp, Rebstock neu, of the Nazi concentration camp Buchenwald was established in Artern.

During World War II, 47 prisoners of war from Poland and France were used as forced labourers at the Weidlich Manor, on the Demesne, and on the river works. Over 400 foreign forced labourers were working in the machine factory Kyffhäuserhütte in 1941. At least another 1,124 forced labourers, predominantly from the Soviet Union, worked in the sugar factory, the brewery, the saline works, on the railways and on farms (also in the nearby village of Schönfeld) and in the outlying estate Kachstedt.

In the Artern subcamp (with cover name A-Dorf) of the concentration camp Mittelbau-Dora, hundreds of prisoners, also from other camps, had to assemble the electrics for V2 rockets. In April 1945 hundreds of concentration camp prisoners were sent on various routes on death marches. The numerous fatalities of the forced labour and the last deportations were buried in the Parkfriedhof cemetery, where a memorial stone was erected, which was removed in 1975.

On 12 April 1945 Artern was occupied by the US Army, and in July of the same year by the Red Army. With this it became part of the Soviet occupation zone and later East Germany.

Historical Population
From 1960 as of 31 December

 Data since 1994: Thüringian State Statistical Office

Twin towns 
The town has three sister cities:
 Einbeck in Niedersachsen (since 2 July 1990)
 Topoľčany in  Slovakia (since 1982, renewed on 2 October 1992)
 Mazingarbe in France (since 11 May 1996)

Notable residents
 John Christopher Kunze (1744-1807), Pietist and evangelical missionary
 Richard Ungewitter (1869-1959), former organizer of the nudist movement
 Johanna Schaller, later Johanna Klier (born 1952), former East German hurdler and Olympic gold medallist

References

External links 

  

Towns in Thuringia
Kyffhäuserkreis